Niphorycta is a genus of moths of the family Xyloryctidae.

Species
 Niphorycta hemipercna Diakonoff, 1954
 Niphorycta hypopercna Meyrick, 1938

References

Xyloryctidae
Xyloryctidae genera